9th Street–Congress Street is a station on the Hudson–Bergen Light Rail (HBLR) operated by New Jersey Transit which opened on September 7, 2004. Located at Ninth Street, west of Jackson Street, in Hoboken, New Jersey, the station also serves the Heights of Jersey City. There are two tracks and two side platforms.

Elevator
9th Street–Congress Street station is notable for having an elevator which runs along the face of the Palisades cliffs between the platforms at their base and Paterson Plank Road at their crest. Use of the elevator is free. Before its construction, travel between Jersey City Heights and Hoboken was along Paterson Plank Road, Mountain Road, 14th Street Viaduct or paths along the cliffs now made inaccessible by fencing along the right of way.

Station layout

References

External links

Subway Nut station info and photos 
 9th Street entrance from Google Maps Street View
 Patterson Plank Road and Congress Street entrance from Google Maps Street View

Hudson-Bergen Light Rail stations
Railway stations in Hudson County, New Jersey
Railway stations in the United States opened in 2004
2004 establishments in New Jersey